Ayizan (also Grande Ai-Zan, Aizan, or Ayizan Velekete) is the loa of the marketplace and commerce in Vodou, especially in Haiti.

Background
She is a racine, or root loa, associated with Vodoun rites of initiation (called kanzo). Just as her husband Loko is the archetypal houngan (priest), Ayizan is regarded as the first, or archetypal, mambo (priestess), and as such is also associated with priestly knowledge and mysteries, particularly those of initiation and the natural world.

As the spiritual parents of the priesthood, she and her husband are two of the loa involved in the kanzo rites in which the priest/ess-to-be is given the asson (sacred rattle and tool of the priesthood) and are both powerful guardians of "reglemen" or the correct and appropriate form of Vodoun service.

She is syncretized with the Catholic Saint Clare. Her symbol is the palm frond, and she drinks no alcohol. Her colors are most commonly silver, blue, and white.

References

External links
An overview of Ayizan
The meaning of Ayizan's name by Max Beauvoir
 Ayizan: The First Priestess of Haitian Vodou

Voodoo goddesses
Haitian Vodou goddesses
Commerce goddesses